Eye is a village in the unitary authority area of Peterborough, in the ceremonial county of Cambridgeshire, England. The hamlet of Eye Green is 1⁄2 mile (800 m) to the north, separated by the A47 trunk road.

History
According to A Dictionary of British Place Names, Eye derives from the Old English ēg, meaning a place at "the island or well-watered land, or dry ground in marsh". In the 10th century, this particular 'Eye' was spelt "Ege".

There has been a church at Eye since at least 1543. The present church, St Matthew's, was built in 1846. Originally built with a spire, this was removed for safety reasons and now has a roofed tower. Adjoined to the southeast corner of the churchyard, and on Back Lane, stands the former village fire station dating from 1826 when it housed a Merryweather fire engine. Closed after 1945, it was repaired by the parish council in 2011.

Eye Cornmill was a windmill with eight sails. Eye was previously one of the brickmaking villages of the Peterborough area, along with Fletton, Yaxley and Stanground. There was a brickpit (a quarry for clay for making bricks). Northolme in Crowland Road was the site of the Brick works Social club. When this closed the buildings and pit were taken over by the British Sub Aqua Club and run as a National Dive Site, managed by the Peterborough Branch. When this closed the buildings were demolished; the brickpit is now a nature reserve.

There was an Eye Green railway station (originally named Eye) on the Midland and Great Northern Joint Railway line between Peterborough and Wisbech, which closed on 2 December 1957.

Eye war memorial, of granite, was erected in Crowland Road Cemetery in 1920. It is dedicated to forty-one killed in the First World War, with fourteen Second World War deaths added later. The memorial was Grade II listed on 23 March 2016.

Eye was in Cambridgeshire until Peterborough became a unitary authority. It was formerly in the Soke of Peterborough in Northamptonshire.

The three-mile £7m A47 Eye bypass opened in October 1991.

In recent decades Eye has seen expansion due to the growing demand for property seen throughout the UK. However, this generated a lot of resistance from residents as a result of the rapid rate of expansion. Between the years of 2001-2011 the population grew from under 3,900 to over 4,400.

Community facilities
Local facilities include a GP surgery, a dentist's surgery, a library, a community centre, a care home, a household recycling centre, a cemetery and a skate park. There are shops and restaurants in the village. There is a Church of England primary school on Eyebury Road.

References

External links

Eye village website
Eye Parish Council
"Manor Farm Community Centre", Eye Community Association

Villages in Cambridgeshire
Geography of Peterborough
Civil parishes in Cambridgeshire